Boli (also known as Bollo) is a town in central Ivory Coast. It is a sub-prefecture of Didiévi Department in Bélier Region, Lacs District.

Boli was a commune until March 2012, when it became one of 1126 communes nationwide that were abolished.

In 2014, the population of the sub-prefecture of Boli was 13,278.

Villages
The 8 villages of the sub-prefecture of Boli and their population in 2014 are:
 Adjébo (624)
 Aka-Kouamékro (1 476)
 Allanikro (1 123)
 Anokoi-Kouamékro (312)
 Boli (7 241)
 Grodiékro (1 622)
 Labo (574)
 Takikro (306)

References

Sub-prefectures of Bélier
Former communes of Ivory Coast